The 2007 Rugby World Cup Final was a rugby union match, played on Saturday, 20 October 2007 at the Stade de France, Saint-Denis, Paris, to determine the winner of the 2007 Rugby World Cup. South Africa beat England 15–6. Having also won the 1995 tournament, South Africa became the second country to win two World Cups, following Australia, who won in 1991 and 1999.

England and South Africa, who won their semi-finals against France and Argentina respectively, had met during the pool stage of the competition, when South Africa won 36–0. South Africa began the final undefeated in the competition. The final was refereed by Irish referee Alain Rolland.

The match itself was try-less with each team scoring only penalties, South Africa five – four by fullback Percy Montgomery and one by centre François Steyn – and England two, both by fly-half Jonny Wilkinson. Each team had one major try scoring opportunity; South Africa's came late in the first half, while England's came early in the second, as wing Mark Cueto had a try disallowed in the 42nd minute after he was ruled to have put a foot in touch during a tackle by Danie Rossouw before grounding the ball. Television match official Stuart Dickinson stood by his decision, though he encountered a language barrier with the French broadcaster preventing his access to frame-by-frame pictures.

Path to the final

Both England and South Africa were placed in Pool A along with Samoa, Tonga and the United States. England's first match was against the United States, whom they beat 28–10. South Africa opened their campaign with a 59–7 victory over Samoa in which they scored seven tries, four of them by Bryan Habana. The two teams then met in their second match of the tournament. For the first time in their World Cup history, England were kept pointless as South Africa scored three tries to win 36–0. South Africa then rested several of their top players for their match against Tonga. Tonga came close to an upset but South Africa held on to win 30–25, guaranteeing the Springboks top position in the pool. England then played Samoa, winning 44–22, before facing Tonga in a match effectively serving as a qualification play-off; whoever won the game would finish second in the pool behind South Africa. England eventually won 36–20, scoring four tries in the process.

England played Australia, who had finished top of Pool B, in their quarter-final. The match was a repeat of the 2003 World Cup final, with England coming out on top again, beating the Wallabies 12–10. All of England's points were scored by Jonny Wilkinson penalties. South Africa faced Fiji, who had defeated Wales to finish as runners-up behind Australia in Pool B. South Africa scored five tries to two and won 37–20. England played hosts France in their semi-final. Despite having less possession and territory England won 14–9. South Africa faced Argentina and scored four tries to one to win 37–13.

Match

Summary

First half
The match was kicked off by England's Jonny Wilkinson, whose kick was collected by Schalk Burger, before the ball was kicked into touch by Butch James, giving England the first line-out throw of the game. However, South Africa stole the ball to win the first line-out of the match. In the sixth minute, Mathew Tait attempted to run the ball from inside England's 22-metre line, only to be tackled and penalised for not releasing the ball in the ruck. South Africa's Percy Montgomery successfully converted the penalty to give the Springboks a 3–0 lead.

An up-and-under kick from England resulted in South African wing JP Pietersen dropping the ball. England regained possession and passed the ball out to winger Paul Sackey, before South Africa were penalised for killing the ball. Wilkinson stepped up to convert the penalty and level the scores at 3–3 after ten minutes. After a lot of kicking from both sides, Butch James was tripped by England flanker Lewis Moody as the South African fly-half was chasing a kick. Montgomery kicked the resulting penalty, to put the South Africans 6–3 up after 15 minutes. Two minutes later, England positioned themselves for an attempted drop-goal, but Wilkinson's attempt was left wanting as it drifted slightly wide.

After 21 minutes, England prop and captain Phil Vickery was penalised for being offside near the halfway line. The resulting penalty kick was taken by South Africa's centre Frans Steyn, but he missed the long-range effort. The match continued with large amounts of kicking from both sides until the 35th minute, when Steyn broke through the England line. South Africa managed to retain possession and eventually their hooker, John Smit, went for the try-line but was held up two metres short. The ball was eventually knocked on by South Africa and England were awarded a five-metre scrum. The scrum had to be reset several times, but the Springbok forwards were finally able to wheel the scrum through 90 degrees to force the turnover. They won the scrum on their own feed and continued to press at England's goal line before England were penalised for killing the ball. A penalty was awarded, which Montgomery kicked to give South Africa a 9–3 half-time lead.

Second half
The second half was kicked off by South Africa's Butch James, and the ball was caught by England's number 8 Nick Easter. After stewards had dealt with a pitch invasion by infamous pitch invader Jimmy Jump, the ball was eventually received by Mathew Tait, who was able to break the South African defensive line, before being tackled metres short of the South African goal line. The ball was recycled and spread left to England winger Mark Cueto, who dived for the try line while being tackled by South African number eight Danie Rossouw. Referee Alain Rolland referred the decision to Australian Television Match Official Stuart Dickinson to determine whether Cueto was in touch before grounding the ball. Dickinson ruled that a foot was in touch and Rolland brought play back to an earlier penalty against Schalk Burger. Wilkinson converted the penalty to reduce South Africa's lead to 9–6 after 42 minutes.

In the 48th minute, Steyn made another break for South Africa and England flanker Martin Corry was penalised for playing the ball off his feet. Montgomery kicked the penalty to restore South Africa's six-point advantage. England penetrated South Africa's 22 in the 58th minute and their scrum-half Andy Gomarsall chipped the ball ahead for Toby Flood to run on to. However, the kick was too deep and was shepherded over the dead ball line by Percy Montgomery. Unable to reach the ball, and trying to force an English five-metre scrum, Flood pushed Montgomery in the back as they both chased for the ball, sending Montgomery into the advertising boards. In his attempt to hurdle the boards, Montgomery collided with a television camera, but referee Rolland decided not to penalise Flood. Three minutes later, just inside England's half, the English were penalised for obstruction, and Steyn kicked a 49-metre penalty to extend South Africa's lead to 15–6.

In the 67th minute, South African captain John Smit was penalised for a collision with Mark Cueto as Cueto chased his own kick. Wilkinson kicked the ball into touch in South Africa's 22 from his own half, but England lost their resulting line-out to give South Africa possession. Requiring at least two scores to overhaul South Africa's lead, England kept attacking, and Wilkinson attempted a long-range drop goal in the 71st minute but was unsuccessful.

England kept possession for long periods during the last ten minutes, but were unable to break through the South African defence. They were penalised in the 75th minute for holding on in the tackle, and South Africa continued to try to play the match in England territory. England then knocked the ball on in the 79th minute, giving South Africa a scrum. The South African forwards secured the ball, and as soon as the clock ticked over the 80-minute mark, the ball was kicked into touch. Referee Rolland then blew the final whistle, and South Africa had won their second World Cup title. This was also the second World Cup title for retiring prop Os du Randt, who was the last player from the Springboks' 1995 championship team still active. He joined five Australians who had been on the Wallabies' 1991 and 1999 championship teams as the only players at that time to have won two World Cups (they would be joined by several New Zealanders who won in 2011 and 2015, and by du Randt's Springboks teammate François Steyn in 2019).

Details

Statistics

References

External links
Knockout stage at rwc2007.irb.com

Final
2007
2007–08 in English rugby union
2007 in South African rugby union
England national rugby union team matches
South Africa national rugby union team matches
History of rugby union matches between England and South Africa